Johnny Corncob is a 1973 Hungarian animated adventure film directed by Marcell Jankovics. It tells the story of a young man who goes on an adventure as a soldier, while longing to be reunited with the woman he loves. The film is based on the 1845 epic poem János vitéz by Sándor Petőfi. It was the first Hungarian animated feature film.

Cast
 György Cserhalmi as Jancsi (Johnny)
 Anikó Nagy as Iluska (his girlfriend)
 Erzsi Pártos as the Mostoha (Iluska's step-mother)
 Antal Farkas as the Gazda (farmer)
 Gábor Mádi Szabó as the Haramiavezér (bandit leader)
 György Bárdy as the Hussar Captain
 János Körmendi as the French king
 Erzsébet Kútvölgyi as the Princess

Production
The film was commissioned by the Hungarian government for the 150th anniversary of Sándor Petőfi's birth. It was produced by Pannonia Film Studio and was Hungary's first ever animated feature film. It was made by a team of 130 people and took 22 months to produce. The visual style was inspired by George Dunning's 1968 film Yellow Submarine.

Trivia
In HBTV, the cartoon was set to Poco's Crazy Love and Stevie Wonder's Whereabouts even though it wasn't a Hanna-Barbera cartoon. This is because Hanna-Barbera had the distribution rights to the film at the time. Hanna-Barbera originally intended to release the film in the United States under the title "Forever Like The Rose". The film was planned to be released in 1978 but was ultimately shelved.

References

1970s adventure films
1970s romance films
1973 animated films
1973 films
Films based on poems
Films directed by Marcell Jankovics
Hungarian animated films
Hungarian romance films
1970s Hungarian-language films